Yannic Seidenberg (born 11 January 1984) is a German professional ice hockey left winger who currently plays for EHC München of the Deutsche Eishockey Liga (DEL).  He is the younger brother of defenseman Dennis Seidenberg.

Playing career
He started his professional career with Adler Mannheim and signed with the Medicine Hat Tigers of the Western Hockey League before the 2003–04 season. After one year he returned to Germany and signed with Kölner Haie; one year later he signed with ERC Ingolstadt, where he spent the next four seasons before returning to Mannheim. On 29 April 2013, Seidenberg signed a two-year deal with DEL rival EHC München. He also represented Germany at the 2018 IIHF World Championship.

Career statistics

Regular season and playoffs

International

References

External links
 

1984 births
Adler Mannheim players
ERC Ingolstadt players
German ice hockey left wingers
Kölner Haie players
Living people
Medicine Hat Tigers players
EHC München players
People from Villingen-Schwenningen
Sportspeople from Freiburg (region)
Ice hockey players at the 2018 Winter Olympics
Medalists at the 2018 Winter Olympics
Olympic ice hockey players of Germany
Olympic medalists in ice hockey
Olympic silver medalists for Germany